Mount Bryce is a mountain at the southwestern corner of the Columbia Icefield, in British Columbia, Canada, near the border with Alberta. It can be seen from the Icefields Parkway.

The mountain was named in 1898 by J. Norman Collie after Viscount James Bryce, who was President of the Alpine Club in London at the time.

Mount Bryce is the fifteenth-highest peak in British Columbia. To the north, it is connected by ridges to the Columbia Icefield. The mountain is rarely climbed due to difficult access although recently built (test)logging roads are alleviating some of the access problems.

References

External links

Mount Bryce on Summitpost

Three-thousanders of British Columbia
Canadian Rockies
Kootenay Land District